Ian Tims (born 3 December 1979) is an Irish cruiserweight professional boxer.

Amateur career
He was Irish heavyweight champion.

Professional career

Irish champion
In 2011, Tims won the Irish title.

European Union title challenge
In 2012, he lost to Juho Haapoja for the European Union title.

WBO regional title challenger
In 2012, he lost to Tony Conquest for the World Boxing Organization intercontinental title.

Celtic champion
In 2015, he won the Celtic title.

References

External links
 

1979 births
Living people
Irish male boxers
Heavyweight boxers